was a Japanese poet and the son of Emperor Tenmu.

Background
His mother was Princess Ōta whose father was Emperor Tenji. He was therefore the younger full-blood brother of Princess Ōku. His consort was Princess Yamanobe, daughter of Emperor Tenji, thus his cousin. His life is known from the Nihon Shoki, and his personality emerges through such poetry anthologies as Kaifūsō and Man'yōshū.

As a poet, Ōtsu is best known for the letters he exchanged with Lady Ishikawa.

Prince Ōtsu was a popular and able figure who was a likely successor of his father to the imperial throne, but was forced to commit suicide after false charges of rebellion were laid against him by Empress Jitō in order to promote her own son, Prince Kusakabe, to the position of crown prince.

Poems
Two examples of his work are below, including the death poem—

Poem sent by Prince Ōtsu to Lady Ishikawa

Gentle foothills, and
in the dew drops of the mountains
soaked, I waited for you –
grew wet from standing there
in the dew drops of the mountains.

Farewell poem
Momozutau / iware no ike ni / naku kamo wo / kyō nomi mite ya / Kumokakuri nan.
Today, taking my last sight of the mallards 
Crying on the pond of Iware, 
Must I vanish into the clouds!

Influence 
Japanese poet and scholar Shinobu Orikuchi featured a fictionalised version of Prince Ōtsu in his novel Sisha no Sho (The Book of the Dead, also made into a film by Kihachirō Kawamoto) as a restless ghost kept on Earth by the memory of a young woman whose gaze he connected with just prior to his death.

663 births
686 deaths
Japanese rebels
Japanese princes
Japanese male poets
7th-century Japanese poets
Man'yō poets
People from Fukuoka Prefecture
Sons of emperors